BWN, BWn, or Bwn may refer to:
Barddhaman Junction railway station, station code "BWN"
Biografisch Woordenboek van Nederland
Bloxwich North railway station, station code "BWN"
Brunei International Airport, IATA  airport code "BWN"
Hm Nai language, ISO 639-3 code "bwn"